Whipple Run is a stream located entirely within Washington County, Ohio.

According to tradition, Whipple Run was named for Abraham Whipple, an explorer who fell in the water while crossing over a fallen tree.

See also
List of rivers of Ohio

References

Rivers of Washington County, Ohio
Rivers of Ohio